{{ National football team
| Name               = Qatar
| Badge              =
| Badge_size         = 
| FIFA Trigramme     = QAT
| Nickname           = Al-Annabi (The Maroon)
| Association        = Qatar Football Association
| Confederation      = AFC (Asia) 
| BSWW Rank          =  
| Coach              = 
| Asst Manager       = 
| Captain            = 
| Vice Captain       = 
| Most caps          = 
| Top scorer         = 
| Home Stadium       = 
| First game         =  
| Largest win        = 
| Largest loss       = 
| pattern_sh1        = _southend1011a
| pattern_b1         = _qat10a
|pattern_so1         = _southend1011a
| leftarm1           = 800000
| body1              = 800000
| rightarm1          = 800000
| shorts1            = 800000
| socks1             =none
| pattern_sh2        = _qat10h
| pattern_b2         = _qat10h
| pattern_so2        = _qat10h
| leftarm2           = ffffff
| body2              = ffffff
| rightarm2          = ffffff
| shorts2            = ffffff
| socks2             =none
}}

The Qatar national beach soccer team represents Qatar in international beach soccer competitions and is controlled by the Qatar Football Association, the governing body for football in Qatar.

Current squadCorrect as of December 2012''.

Achievements
 Asian Beach Games Best: 14th place
 2008, 2010

References

Asian national beach soccer teams
Beach Soccer